The King's Messengers is an American Teen drama mini-series produced by Crystal Creek Media that will premiere on the PureFlix platform. It centers on Anwaar Osem (Christopher Veldhuizen) and David Sutherland (Daniel Knudsen), two refugees trying to survive in the fictional war-torn country of Zanora. The series was awarded a Dove seal of family approval from the Dove Foundation.

Plot
Anwaar's parents were killed during an air raid led by forces fighting for political control of Zanora. He flees to the northern forest to escape a corrupt regime as well as the dangerous Resistance Army. While hiding out and surviving in the woods he meets David Sutherland, a fellow refugee who is also trying to escape the Resistance Army. Anwaar questions David on a computer that David has, however David will not reveal any information to Anwaar. After a close call with a Resistance soldier, David reveals that his brother Allen gave him the computer and it has something important on it. David himself does not know what the computer contains as it was entrusted to him while he narrowly escaped during a raid on the British consulate by the Resistance Army. Anwaar convinces David to do a webcast with the computer and eventually the two become friends.

Cast and characters

Main

 Christopher Veldhuizen as Anwaar Osem, the son of a pastor who was recently killed by members of the Resistance Army.  Anwaar serves as the inspiration for David to create the messenger message videos where they webcast segments about faith.
 Daniel Knudsen as David Sutherland is the son of the British Royal Ambassador to Zanora. Ambassador Adam Sutherland was recently killed by members of the Resistance Army fighting for political control of Zanora.
 Anne Lampert as Nema Rownan, an Office of Foreign Peace affairs director at the Alliance of Nations.
 Kristina Kaylen as Alexa Corwin, a peacekeeping correspondent for the Alliance of Nations.
 Damion Stevenson as Dmitri, a sharp I.T. professional working for the Alliance of Nations.
 Mike Tremblay as General Riven, the main antagonist in the show leading the Resistance Army.

Recurring
 Jonathan DeRoos as Braiser, a Resistance Army soldier.
 Greg Tull as Allen Sutherland, brother of David.
 Rich Swingle as British Ambassador Adam Sutherland.
 Rusty Martin Jr. from Courageous makes a cameo appearance as network news anchor.

Episodes

Season 1: 2017–2017

Production
Principal photography for The King’s Messengers took place during the summer of 2016. Most of the show was filmed on location near Detroit, Michigan with additional photography taking place in New York City. Crystal Creek Media released a trailer for the series on June 19, 2017.

Reception
The first four episodes premiered as a film at the 2017 Christian Worldview Film Festival. The mini-series also received a five-Dove review rating from the Dove Foundation.

References

External links 
 Crystal Creek Media
 

2010s American teen drama television series
2017 American television series debuts
American action television series
English-language television shows
Christian entertainment television series
Christian media
Evangelicalism in the United States